The Wilco Building is a high rise in downtown Midland, Texas. In 1985, the Wilco Building underwent some renovations. It is one of the iconic images of the Midland downtown skyline.

See also 
 List of tallest buildings in Midland, Texas

Office buildings completed in 1958
Skyscraper office buildings in Midland, Texas